Modestia (minor planet designation: 370 Modestia) is probably a typical Main belt asteroid. It was discovered by Auguste Charlois on 14 July 1893 in Nice.

References

External links
 
 

Background asteroids
Modestia
Modestia
X-type asteroids (Tholen)
18930714